So Ji-sub (born November 4, 1977) is a South Korean actor. After making his entertainment debut as a jeans model, he became known for his leading roles in the television series What Happened in Bali (2004), I'm Sorry, I Love You (2004), Cain and Abel (2009), Phantom (2012), Master's Sun (2013), and Oh My Venus (2015–16), as well as the film Rough Cut (2008). So has also released several hip hop EPs.

Early life
So Ji-sub was born on November 4, 1977, in Incheon. Self-described as introverted and insecure in his childhood and teenage years, So trained to become a professional swimmer for 11 years and bagged the bronze medal at the Korean National Games. His parents divorced at a young age. He has one older sister who lives in Australia.

He tried out modeling simply because he wanted to pose alongside hip-hop artist Kim Sung-jae, who was the celebrity face for a clothing brand at the time. "I was never really interested in becoming a celebrity," So said. "My life was all about swimming and hip-hop music. I did modeling because I wanted to see Kim and also because it was the best way to earn good easy money."

Career

Acting
So was chosen as a model for jeans brand 292513=STORM in 1995, then made his acting debut in the sitcom Three Guys and Three Girls and the television drama Model. But whereas fellow 292513=STORM model Song Seung-heon quickly rose to stardom, So had difficulty raising his profile. He appeared in small roles on television throughout the late 1990s and early 2000s, and started to gain popularity when he was cast as the male second lead in Glass Slippers in 2002. He played his first lead role in the time travel historical drama Thousand Years of Love.

So began to rise to fame with 2004 hit drama What Happened in Bali  At that time, So thought he would end up being a supporting actor. But later that year, he had his breakout role as a tragic hero in the critically acclaimed melodrama I'm Sorry, I Love You. It established him as a top star in Korea, as well as all over Asia. In a 2009 interview, So said he still considers the two the best television dramas in his filmography.

So enlisted for mandatory military service in 2005 as a public relations officer with the Mapo District Office, and was discharged on April 27, 2007. He made his comeback in Jang Hoon's directorial debut Rough Cut, in which he played a gangster who dreams of becoming an actor. Because of the film's low budget, So and costar Kang Ji-hwan decided to invest their fees back into the movie, and were credited as producers. So's performance was well received by audiences and critics, and the film became a surprise box office hit.

In 2009, So attempted to break into the Japanese and Chinese markets. In I am GHOST, an action drama that aired in 24 five-minute episodes on Japan's mobile-exclusive broadcaster BeeTV, he played a mysterious killer on the run with a high school girl. So spoke no lines in the mobile drama, and was "worried whether (their) emotions would be delivered just through (their) motions." The year before, he had appeared in a supporting role as a monster in the Japanese manga live-action adaptation GeGeGe No Kitaro 2: Kitaro and the Millenium Curse.

So starred opposite Zhang Ziyi in the Chinese romantic comedy Sophie's Revenge, saying, "I wanted to do a bright and cheery role because I've played so many sad and gloomy ones." He later signed with a Chinese talent agency, ATN Entertainment. So then returned to Korean television with Cain and Abel, about two doctor brothers with an intense sibling rivalry. His performance received critical acclaim, and won him Best Actor at the 2009 Grimae Awards, an honorable award chosen by directors in every broadcasting station in Korea.

In 2010 So headlined the big-budget Korean War epic Road No. 1, but despite high expectations, the series tanked in the ratings, averaging 6% for its entire run.

So then played a boxer who falls in love with a blind girl in romantic melodrama Always (Korean title: Only You), directed by auteur Song Il-gon. It was the opening film of the 2011 Busan International Film Festival.

After portraying a workaholic detective in the cyber criminal investigative service in TV procedural Phantom, So starred in the film A Company Man, about a hitman in a killer-for-hire company who, after he falls in love and decides he wants out of his job, finds himself the target of his former colleagues.

Later that year he starred in Master's Sun, a horror-romantic comedy written by the Hong sisters. Known for his melodramatic roles, So made an acting transformation in Master's Sun, playing a character with charm. The drama was a commercial hit and renewed his domestic and international popularity. So then starred in another romantic comedy series Oh My Venus, about a celebrity trainer who helps a lawyer lose weight and find her inner beauty as they heal each other's emotional scars.

In 2017, So starred in the film The Battleship Island, which depicts the unknown history behind the actual Hashima Island, where thousands of conscripted Joseon people were forced to work to death during the Japanese colonial era. He plays Gyeongseong's best fighter who brought peace to the entire Jongno district.

In 2018, So starred alongside Son Ye-jin in the romance film Be with You, based on the Japanese novel of the same name. The same year, he returned to the small screen with spy comedy drama My Secret Terrius. So won his first major award, the "Daesang (Grand Prize)" at the MBC Drama Awards for his performance.

In 2022, he starred in MBC medical-legal drama Doctor Lawyer in the title role as a genius double-board surgeon turned lawyer and appeared in Choi Dong-hoon's science fiction action film Alienoid.

Book and music releases
In 2010, So published his photo-essay collection, So Ji-sub's Journey. The volume covers stories and photos over the past 13 years since his debut, using unpretentious language and sensitive photography taken during So's trips to the DMZ and Gangwon Province. The usually taciturn and stoic actor revealed his inner thoughts throughout the book, with essays on his favorite number 51 (reflected in the name of his company - it means a 50-50 probability then believing just 1% more; the K stands for Korea), Romeo and Juliet, why he likes rainy days, and stories about his interactions with other celebrities and artists such as Tiger JK. Within ten days of its release, the book hit the bestseller list, and entered its third printing.

A professed longtime hip-hop lover, So rapped for two original tracks – "Lonely Life" and "Foolish Love" – under the artist pseudonym "G" or "G-Sonic" for the soundtracks of Rough Cut and Cain and Abel respectively. In 2011, he released another digital single Pick Up Line under his own name. Two teaser videos were released, the first one described as a comedic version that featured guest stars Jung Joon-ha (who is a close friend of So's) and Kim Byung-man (whom So named as one of his favorite comedians). The single, along with the music video itself, was released on February 17, 2011, but recorded low sales.

In 2011, he published a second book of photo-essays titled Only You with So Ji-sub featuring photographs, notes and commentary on playing his movie character.

On March 14, 2012, he launched a magazine for his fans titled SONICe; inside were So's suggested dating ideas and locations, favorite food and books, and more stories through his eyes. Its name is a combination of "so nice" and "Sonic," which is So's nickname.

So's first mini-album (or EP), Corona Borealis was released in March 2012. It featured collaborations with songwriter Kim Kun-woo, vocal trainer Mellow, soprano Han Kyung-mi, and singers Huh Gak and Bobby Kim. Bobby Kim complimented So's rapping in their duet track That Day, a Year Ago, saying, "So has a talent in feeling the groove and it's as good as his acting skills." So also starred in a music video of the album's title song "Some Kind of Story".

In January 2013, So released another rap EP titled 6 PM...Ground, and his recording process aired on Music Triangle as part of Mnet's Collabo One project. The four songs of the album were combined to make a 12-minute music drama starring So, Park Shin-hye and Yoo Seung-ho; which was also re-edited into individual music videos for each track.

In June 2014, So released his third electro-hip-hop EP titled 18 Years, which represents how long he has been in the industry since he debuted as an actor. He wrote and composed the title track (featuring the vocals of singer Satbyeol), and the other two tracks were collaborations with hip-hop group Soul Dive. He released another single in July 2015 titled So Ganzi, his second collaboration with Soul Dive.

Ambassadorship
So was named the goodwill ambassador of Gangwon Province in an effort to boost tourism there, and a 51 kilometer-long trail in the province was named "So Ji-sub Road," which was unveiled to the public on May 20, 2012. He was the first Korean actor to have an entire road named after him.

He was also named promotional ambassadors for cyber crime prevention by the National Police Agency, helping to raise awareness and prevent cyber crimes such as hacking and Internet fraud by taking part in various promotional activities.

Investments
So is the owner of the Apgujeong-dong branch of CJ Foodville's A Twosome Place.

He has also helped imported foreign films, having invested in art-house films such as the U.S.-British-French co-production Philomena (2014), the Chinese film Coming Home (2014), the Japanese crime thriller The World of Kanako (2014)" and the American horror film A Girl Walks Home Alone at Night (2015).

Personal life
In 2019, So confirmed that he was in a relationship with former announcer and reporter Jo Eun-jung. On April 7, 2020, the actor's label 51K confirmed that he had registered his marriage with Jo.

Filmography

Film

Television series

Web series

Music video

Variety show

Discography

Albums

Digital singles

Books

Awards and nominations

Listicles

References

External links

 Official website 
 
 
 

South Korean male film actors
South Korean male television actors
South Korean male models
South Korean male web series actors
1977 births
Living people
People from Incheon
21st-century South Korean male actors
Jinju So clan
Best New Actor Paeksang Arts Award (film) winners